Ignacio "Nacho" Azofra de la Cuesta (born 23 July 1969) is a retired Spanish professional basketball player. He played most of his career for Estudiantes, with two brief spells playing for Caja San Fernando and Lagun Aro Bilbao. He also played for the Spain national basketball team.

Professional career

A 1.85 m (6'1') tall point guard, Azofra led the EuroLeague in assists, with 5.6 per game in the 1992–93 season. He spent almost his whole career playing for Estudiantes, with which he reached the 1992 EuroLeague Final Four, and a Korać Cup final in 1999. He is considered to be one of the all-time figures of the club of the club of Estudiantes.

He played in 705 games in the ACB League (the top-tier level Spanish basketball league), the third most in ACB history.

Spain national team
Azofra was also a member of the senior Spain men's national basketball team. He played at the 1998 FIBA World Championship.

Coaching career
After his retirement from his basketball playing career, Azofra returned to MMT Estudiantes, in a coaching role.

Awards

Clubs
 2x Spanish King's Cup Winner: (1991–92 and 1999–00) with Estudiantes
 EuroLeague Final Four: (1991–92) with Estudiantes
 Korać Cup Runner-up: (1998–99) with Estudiantes
 Spanish League Runner-up: (2003–04) with Estudiantes

References

External links 
Euroleague.net Profile
Fibaeurope.com Profile

1969 births
Living people
Spanish men's basketball players
Liga ACB players
Bilbao Basket players
Real Betis Baloncesto players
CB Estudiantes players
1998 FIBA World Championship players
Point guards